Vasily Aleksandrovich Arkhipov (30 January 1926 – 19 August 1998) was a Soviet Naval officer who prevented a Soviet nuclear torpedo launch during the Cuban Missile Crisis. Such an attack likely would have caused a major global thermonuclear response, destroying large parts of the Northern Hemisphere. 

As flotilla Commodore as well as executive officer of the diesel powered submarine , Arkhipov refused to authorize the captain and the political officer's use of nuclear torpedoes against the United States Navy, a decision which required the agreement of all three officers. In 2002, Thomas S. Blanton, then director of the U.S. National Security Archive, credited Arkhipov as "the man who saved the world".

Early life
Arkhipov was born into a peasant family in the town of Staraya Kupavna, near Moscow. He was educated in the Pacific Higher Naval School and participated in the Soviet–Japanese War in August 1945, serving aboard a minesweeper. He transferred to the Caspian Higher Naval School and graduated in 1947.

Early career
After graduating in 1947, Arkhipov served in the submarine service aboard boats in the Black Sea, Northern and Baltic Fleets.

K-19 accident

In July 1961, Arkhipov was appointed deputy commander and therefore executive officer of the new  ballistic missile submarine K-19. After a few days of conducting exercises off the south-east coast of Greenland, the submarine developed an extreme leak in its reactor coolant system. This leak led to a failure of the cooling system. Radio communications were also affected, and the crew was unable to make contact with Moscow. 

With no backup systems, captain Nikolai Zateyev ordered the seven members of the engineer crew to come up with a solution to avoid nuclear meltdown. This required the men to work in high radiation levels for extended periods. They eventually came up with a secondary coolant system and were able to prevent a reactor meltdown. 

Although they were able to save themselves from a nuclear meltdown, the entire crew, including Arkhipov, were irradiated. All members of the engineer crew and their divisional officer died within a month due to the high levels of radiation they were exposed to. Over the course of two years, 15 more sailors died from the after-effects.

Involvement in Cuban Missile Crisis

On 27 October 1962, during the Cuban Missile Crisis, a group of 11 United States Navy destroyers and the aircraft carrier  located the diesel-powered, nuclear-armed   near Cuba. (The B-59 was one of four Foxtrot submarines sent by the USSR to the area around Cuba.) Despite being in international waters, the United States Navy started dropping signaling depth charges, which were intended to force the submarine to come to the surface for identification. 

By then, there had been no contact from Moscow for a number of days, and although the B-59s crew had been picking up U.S. civilian radio broadcasts earlier on, the submarine was too deep to monitor any radio traffic, as it was busy trying to hide from its American pursuers. Those on board did not know whether war had broken out or not. The captain of the submarine, Valentin Grigoryevich Savitsky, decided that a war might already have started and wanted to launch a nuclear torpedo.

Unlike other Soviet submarines armed with the "Special Weapon", where only the captain and the political officer were required to authorize a nuclear launch, the authorization of all three officers on board the B-59 were needed instead; this was due to Arkhipov's position as Commodore of the flotilla. The three men were captain Savitsky, political officer Ivan Semyonovich Maslennikov, and executive officer Arkhipov. An argument broke out between the three of them, with only Arkhipov against the launch.

Although Arkhipov was only second-in-command of the B-59, he was the Commodore of the entire submarine flotilla, which included the B-4, the B-36 and the B-130. According to author Edward Wilson, the reputation Arkhipov had gained from his courageous conduct in the previous year's K-19 incident played a large role in the debate to launch the torpedo. Arkhipov eventually persuaded Savitsky to surface and await orders from Moscow. His persuasion effectively averted a nuclear war which would have likely ensued if the nuclear weapon had been fired. The B-59s batteries ran very low and its air conditioning failed, which caused extreme heat and generated high levels of carbon dioxide inside the submarine. It surfaced amid the US warships pursuing it and made contact with a US destroyer. After discussions with the ship, B-59 was then ordered by the Russian fleet to set course back to the Soviet Union.

In 1997 Arkhipov himself wrote that after surfacing, his submarine was fired on by American aircraft: "the plane, flying over the conning tower, 1 to 3 seconds before the start of fire
turned on powerful searchlights and blinded the people on the bridge...  when [the commander] blinked and blinked his eyes and could see again, it became clear that the plane was firing past and along the boat. And the subsequent similar actions (there were 12 overflights altogether) were not as worrisome any longer."

Aftermath
Immediately upon return to Russia, many crew members were faced with disgrace from their superiors. One admiral told them "It would have been better if you'd gone down with your ship." Olga, Arkhipov's wife, said that "he didn't like talking about it, he felt they hadn't appreciated what they had gone through." Each captain was required to present a report of events during the mission to Marshal Andrei Grechko, who substituted for the ill Soviet defense minister.

Grechko was infuriated with the crew's failure to follow the strict orders of secrecy after finding out they had been discovered by the Americans. One officer even noted Grechko's reaction, stating that he "upon learning that it was the diesel submarines that went to Cuba, removed his glasses and hit them against the table in fury, breaking them into small pieces and abruptly leaving the room after that."

In 2002, retired commander Vadim Pavlovich Orlov, a participant in the events, held a press conference revealing the submarines were armed with nuclear torpedoes and that Arkhipov was the reason those weapons had not been fired. Orlov presented the events less dramatically, saying that Captain Savitsky lost his temper, but eventually calmed down.

Robert McNamara, US Secretary of Defense at the time of the Cuban Missile Crisis, stated in 2002 that "We came very, very close [to nuclear war], closer than we knew at the time." Arthur M. Schlesinger Jr., an advisor for the John F. Kennedy administration and a historian, continued this thought by stating "This was not only the most dangerous moment of the Cold War. It was the most dangerous moment in human history."

Later life and death
Arkhipov continued in Soviet Navy service, commanding submarines and later submarine squadrons. He was promoted to rear admiral in 1975, and became head of the Kirov Naval Academy. Arkhipov was promoted to vice admiral in 1981 and retired in the mid-1980s.

He settled in Kupavna (which was incorporated into Zheleznodorozhny, Moscow Oblast, in 2004), where he died on 19 August 1998. The radiation to which Arkhipov had been exposed in 1961 may have contributed to his kidney cancer, like many others who served with him in the K-19 accident.

Nikolai Zateyev, the commander of the submarine K-19 at the time of its onboard nuclear accident, died on 28 August 1998. Both Arkhipov and Zateyev were 72 at the time of their deaths.

Personal life

Arkhipov was married to Olga Arkhipova until his death in 1998. They had a daughter named Yelena. 

Arkhipov was known to be a shy and humble man. In a 2012 PBS documentary titled The Man Who Saved the World, his wife described him as intelligent, polite and very calm. Much of what is known about his personality comes from her. According to her, he enjoyed searching for newspapers during their vacations and tried to stay up-to-date with the modern world as much as possible. In this same interview, Olga alluded to her husband's possible superstitious beliefs as well. She recalls walking in on Vasily burning a bundle of their love letters inside their house, claiming that keeping the letters would mean "bad luck".

In popular culture 
The character of Captain Mikhail Polenin, portrayed by Liam Neeson, in the 2002 film K-19: The Widowmaker was closely based on Arkhipov's tenure on Soviet submarine K-19. Similarly, Denzel Washington's character in Crimson Tide (1995) is an officer who refused to affirm the launch orders of a submarine captain. Leon Ockenden portrayed Arkhipov in Season 12 Episode 1 of Secrets of the Dead, titled "The Man Who Saved the World". It was aired 23 October 2012 on the 50th anniversary of the Cuban Missile Crisis. 

The 2021 novel Red Traitor by Owen Matthews includes Arkhipov as a major viewpoint character, and is dedicated to him.

The musical group Converge dedicated a composition called "Arkhipov Calm" to Arkhipov in 2017.

Awards and honors
In recognition of his actions onboard B-59, Arkhipov received the first "Future of Life Award," which was presented posthumously to his family in 2017. Offered by the Future of Life Institute, this award recognizes exceptional measures, often performed despite personal risk and without obvious reward, to safeguard the collective future of humanity.

In 2002, Thomas S. Blanton, the director of the U.S. National Security Archive, said that Arkhipov "saved the world".

See also
 Stanislav Petrov, a Soviet duty officer at a missile warning station who averted a possible nuclear war in 1983
 National Security Archive, its director, Thomas S. Blanton, has undertaken substantial research on Arkhipov's involvement during the Cuban Missile Crisis
 List of nuclear close calls

References

External links

 PBS special on the crisis: The Man Who Saved the World

1926 births
1998 deaths
Cold War military history of the Soviet Union
Communist Party of the Soviet Union members
Cuban Missile Crisis
People from Orekhovo-Zuyevsky District
People of the Cold War
Recipients of the Medal "For Distinction in Guarding the State Border of the USSR"
Recipients of the Medal of Zhukov
Recipients of the Order "For Service to the Homeland in the Armed Forces of the USSR", 3rd class
Recipients of the Order of the Red Banner
Recipients of the Order of the Red Star
Soviet admirals
Soviet military personnel of World War II
Soviet submarine commanders
War scare